The Xiamen Orient Masters is a golf tournament on the China LPGA Tour. From 2014 to 2016 it was co-sanctioned by the Ladies European Tour and played as the Xiamen International Ladies Open. It is played at the Xiamen Orient Golf & Country Club in Xiamen, China.

Winners

References

External links
Coverage on the Ladies European Tour's official site

Former Ladies European Tour events
Golf tournaments in China
Recurring sporting events established in 2014